Punch is a Canadian dark comedy film, directed by Guy Bennett and released in 2002.

Plot
The film stars Michael Riley as Sam Frizzell, a widowed single father in Vancouver, British Columbia whose desire to find a new partner is complicated by his daughter Ariel's (Sonja Bennett) jealousy of any new woman in his life. However, when Ariel physically attacks Sam's newest love interest Mary (Marcia Laskowski), Mary's sister Julie (Meredith McGeachie), a lesbian professional boxer, comes to her sister's defense. The film's cast also includes Vincent Gale, Kathryn Kirkpatrick, Don Ackerman and Sarah Lind.

Production
Guy Bennett excused himself from the set when they shot the more revealing scene in which his daughter Sonja Bennett is sitting naked on a bed with her legs apart in an attempt to seduce her tutor, and watched from a monitor in another room. But the idea of putting his daughter in this vulnerable position never gave him pause for a moment. "Everything is subservient to the drama," he explained.

Awards
At the Vancouver Film Critics Circle Awards 2002, Bennett won for Best Actress in a Canadian Film and McGeachie won for Best Supporting Actress in a Canadian Film. McGeachie received a Genie Award nomination for Best Supporting Actress at the 24th Genie Awards.

References

External links
 

2002 films
2002 black comedy films
Canadian black comedy films
English-language Canadian films
Films set in Vancouver
Films shot in Vancouver
Canadian LGBT-related films
LGBT-related black comedy films
2002 LGBT-related films
2002 comedy films
2000s English-language films
2000s Canadian films